William Love may refer to:

 William Love (Australian politician) (1810–1885), member of the New South Wales Legislative Assembly
 William Love (London MP) (c. 1620–1689), Member of Parliament (MP) for the City of London
 William Carter Love (1784–1835), U.S. Representative from North Carolina 
 William Edward Love (1806–1867), English impressionist
 William F. Love (1850–1898), U.S. Representative from Mississippi
 William H. Love (born 1957), Episcopal bishop of Albany, New York
 William L. Love (born 1872), New York politician
 William D. Love (1859–1933) United States Tax Court judge
 Willie Love (1906–1953), pianist

See also
 Love (surname)